The Game Boy Advance SP (GBA SP), released in Japan on February 14, 2003, is a sixth-generation handheld game console developed, released, and marketed by Nintendo that served as an upgraded version of the original Game Boy Advance. The "SP" in the name stands for "Special". It is the penultimate console in the Game Boy Advance product line before the Game Boy Micro, which was released in September 2005.

Technical specifications

Physical
 Size (closed): Approximately 8.4 × 8.2 × 2.44 cm (3.3 × 3.23 × 0.96 inches).
 Weight: 142 grams (approximately 5 ounces).
 Color: 15-bit RGB (simultaneously display up to 32,768 colors)
 Screen: 2.9 inch reflective TFT color LCD.
 Framerate: 59.737 Hz
 Light source: Frontlight integrated LCD (AGS-001) / Backlight integrated LCD (AGS-101)
 Power: Rechargeable lithium ion battery.
 Battery life: 10 hours continuous play with light on, 18 hours with light off; needs at most 3 hours recharging.
 AGS-001: Frontlit screen, frontlight can be turned on or off
 AGS-101: Backlit screen, with the ability to change the brightness of the backlight

Hardware colors 
The GBA SP launched in Platinum Silver and Cobalt Blue, with the addition of Onyx in Europe and Japan. Later colors include: Flame, Pearl Pink, Pearl Blue, Graphite, Midnight Blue, Charizard Fire Red, Torchic Orange, Venusaur Leaf Green, NES classic design, and Pikachu Yellow. A limited gold edition with a Triforce and the Hyrule Royal Family crest was available in Europe which included a copy of The Legend of Zelda: The Minish Cap. In 2003, Toys "R" Us sold an exclusive gold edition (without any Zelda symbols) in the US starting on Black Friday of that year, initially with a Super Mario Advance 4 game.

In Japan, it was released in a variety of standard colors and special packages. In most other regions it was released in Platinum Silver and Charcoal Black. Later, a Flame Red version was released. Six special editions have also been released: an NES Classics model with the same color scheme as a classic NES controller (and designed to resemble an NES deck when closed), a SpongeBob SquarePants model, a Pikachu model, and a silver model with a tattoo design printed on it, known as the 'Tribal Edition'. In other regions, such as Europe, Asia, and the Middle East, additional colors have been released, such as Pearl Green and Starlight Gold.

Nintendo was planning to have the SP be 3D-compatible, but the resolution of the LCD was too low, resulting in Nintendo scrapping it.

Internal
 CPU (for GBA games): 32-bit ARM7TDMI with embedded memory.
 CPU (for GB and GBC games): 8-bit Sharp LR35902 (8080-derived)
 Memory: 32 kilobyte+96 kilobyte VRAM (internal CPU), 256 kilobyte DRAM (external CPU).
 Resolution: 240 × 160 pixels.
 Color: 15-bit RGB (15-bit color space using 5 bits depth per channel), capable of displaying 512 (29) simultaneous colors in "character mode" and 32,768 (215) simultaneous colors in "bitmap mode".
 Software: Compatible with most Game Boy and Game Boy Color games. Game Boy games can be played using the same selectable color palettes as on the Game Boy Color.

Headphone jack

Nintendo removed the TRS headphone jack from the SP, which had been included on all previous Game Boy models. Headphones designed specifically for the GBA SP can be purchased, or standard headphones can be attached with an optional, stereophonic adapter that plugs into the same port as the AC adapter. Since the Nintendo DS used the same charging port as the GBA SP, the headphone adapter works with said console.

As both AC adapter and headphones use the same port, it is not possible to charge the SP and listen to headphones at the same time with the Nintendo brand adapter. There are, however, third-party adapters that "split" into two different cords; the power jack on one side, and a TS headphone jack on the other.

Backlit model (AGS-101)

In 2005, Nintendo released an improved version of the Game Boy Advance SP in North America, featuring a brighter backlit screen instead of the previous version's frontlit screen. This GBA SP was Nintendo's first internationally-released handheld system to feature an integrated backlight. (However, there had already been a backlit system years earlier with the Japan-only Game Boy Light, which was essentially a Game Boy Pocket with an electroluminescent backlit display.) The AGS-101 was never officially released in Japan, however, as the frontlit AGS-001 models were still available on the market until the end of production.

The new model can be distinguished by the following features:

 The box states "Now with a BRIGHTER backlit screen!" to distinguish the new model from the older, frontlit models.
 The model number of the backlit SP is AGS-101, whereas the model number of the original frontlit SP is AGS-001. This can be found on the label at the bottom of the unit.
 The mini button at the top center of the console's lower face is now referred to in the manual as the "Brightness Switch" and selects between two levels of brightness, "Normal" (Low) and "Bright" (High) with no off setting. On the frontlit models this button turned the frontlight on or off only. With the backlight set to "Normal" (Low) the brightness still surpasses the original AGS-001 with the frontlight on.
 When powered off, the backlit model's screen is completely black, but the frontlit model's screen is noticeably lighter.

The North American backlit version comes in three standard colors: "Pearl Blue", "Pearl Pink" and "Graphite" (a greyer version of Onyx Black). There were also two Toys "R" Us exclusive backlit models; a "SpongeBob SquarePants" model and a "Limited Edition Pikachu" model.

In 2006, the AGS-101 backlit model also saw a very limited release in Europe. Few models made it to market, likely due to the release of the Game Boy Advance-compatible Nintendo DS one year prior. The European version was released in "Surf Blue" as well as re-issued in "Pink" and "Tribal" editions.

Unlike the North American release, the European box does not feature any prominent text to distinguish the backlit models from the older frontlit models. In addition, only the "Surf Blue" color was unique to the AGS-101, the other two colors "Pink" and "Tribal" had already been released as frontlit models - for these reasons it can be very difficult to identify a European backlit SP. Apart from the AGS-101 model number on the base of the unit, the only other obvious distinguishing feature of the European backlit model is the large picture of the Game Boy Advance SP featured on the front of the box. (The European frontlit models of "Pink" and "Tribal" only feature small pictures of the Game Boy Advance SP on the sides of the box and Flower/Tattoo patterns on the front respectively.)

The AGS-101 Game Boy Advance SP was the final Nintendo handheld to have backwards compatibility with Game Boy and Game Boy Color games in North America and Europe.

Unit colors
The Game Boy Advance SP had numerous colors and limited editions.

 All Blacks (New Zealand only)
 Black Blargg (Limited Edition)
 Blue Kyogre
 Cobalt Blue
 Flame Red
 Famicom 20th Anniversary Edition
 Gold with Zelda Triforce
 Graphite
 Green & Orange (Limited Edition)
 Green Rayquaza
 Green Venusaur
 Kingdom Silver (Kingdom Hearts: Chain of Memories Edition)
 Mario
 NES Black (UK and US only as a limited edition)
 Onyx Black
 Pearl Blue
 Pearl Green
 Pearl Pink
 Pearl White (Limited Edition)
 Pikachu Yellow
 Platinum
 Platinum & Onyx (Limited Edition)
 Red Groudon
 Snow White
 Spice & Lime
 Starlight Gold (Toys R Us exclusive)
 SpongeBob
 Surf Blue (UK only)
 Torchic Orange
 Tribal
 White Rip Curl special edition (Australia only)
 "Who Are You?" (Black with "Who Are You?" printed on the top)

Reception
M. Wiley of IGN called the Game Boy Advance SP "a step in the right direction for Nintendo", praising the system's new redesign over the original GBA and highlighting its inclusion of a backlit screen and rechargeable battery, although minor criticism went towards the system's omission of a headphone jack. Engadget gave it a global score of 84 out of 100, also praising the new features of the redesign while noting the system's lack of a headphone jack. Lawson Wong of Fresh Gear called it "darn close to perfection" aside from the missing headphone jack. Matthew D. Sarrel of PC Magazine suggested it to consumers as an improvement over the original model, praising the backlight and integration of a charger as well as improved visual quality, though he noted that players with larger hands may find difficulty with the system's design.

Sales
As of June 30, 2009, the Game Boy Advance series has sold 81.48 million units worldwide, of which 43.52 million are Game Boy Advance SP units.

See also

 List of Game Boy Advance games

Notes

References

External links

Comparison of GBA SP model 101 vs 001

Backward-compatible video game consoles
Discontinued handheld game consoles
Game Boy Advance
Game Boy consoles
Golden Joystick Award winners
Handheld game consoles
IQue consoles
Products introduced in 2003
Products and services discontinued in 2008
Regionless game consoles
Sixth-generation video game consoles
de:Game Boy Advance#Game Boy Advance SP
hu:Nintendo#Game Boy sorozat
simple:Game Boy Advance#Game Boy Advance SP